Sylva Koscina (born Silvija Košćina, ; 22 August 1933 – 26 December 1994) was a Yugoslav-born Italian actress, maybe best remembered for her role as Iole, the bride of Hercules (Steve Reeves) in Hercules (1958) and Hercules Unchained (1960). She also played Paul Newman's romantic interest in The Secret War of Harry Frigg (1968).

Early life
She was born Silvija Košćina to a Greek father, who had a hotel in the "West Coast" section of Split, Dalmatia, and a Polish mother.

During World War II, in her preadolescence, Košćina was brought to Italy to live with her older sister, who had married an Italian citizen.

After winning beauty contests as a teenager, she was offered modelling work. In 1954, while studying physics at the University of Naples, and living in a boarding school of nuns, she was asked to be Miss di Tappa ("Stage Miss"), who presents flowers to the winner of a stage of the 1954 Giro d'Italia bicycle race, then at Naples. She was convinced, but with difficulty because of her shyness, then a picture of her, kissing the winner, was published in newspapers all over Europe.

Career

Eduardo De Filippo noticed her and decided to cast her in a small role for the movie Questi fantasmi (1954) that was about to be filmed. This did not eventually happen, but it did lead to a small part, of an aspiring actress, alongside Totò in Are We Men or Corporals? (1955) by Camillo Mastrocinque, leading to her breakout role, portraying Giulia, daughter of the train engineer Andrea, in Pietro Germi's The Railroad Man (1956). Koscina returned in Guendalina (1957), playing the part of a young mother.

A lead player in popular comedies, such as Nonna Sabella (Grandmother Sabella, 1957), Ladro lui, ladra lei (He a thief, she a thief, 1958), and Poveri milionari (Poor millionaires, 1958), Koscina alternated cleverly between roles as vamp and ingenue. She represented women in search of social upward mobility, the image of an Italy that had left its worst problems behind.

Koscina was suited to sophisticated comedies like Mogli pericolose (Dangerous wives, 1958), where she made a direct sentimental challenge to poor Giorgia Moll. She played Hercules' fiancée in Le fatiche di Ercole (Hercules, 1958), a prototype of this kind of film. In Italy, a police officer let her go without issuing a traffic ticket. Later, as a guest on a television program, she thanked the policeman, thus getting him into trouble with the police department. The incident and its aftermath inspired the movie Il vigile (The Traffic Policeman, 1960), in which she played herself.

In the first half of the 1960s, she married her lover, Raimondo Castelli, a small producer connected with Minerva Films. She managed to keep well afloat with roles in Damiano Damiani's  (The Hired Killer, 1961). In La lepre e la tartaruga (The Tortoise and the Hare), an episode in Le quattro verita (The Three Fables of Love) (1963), the director Blasetti constructed a duel between Koscina and Monica Vitti. In 1965, Koscina appeared in Giulietta degli spiriti. She was also a television personality and often made special guest appearances on variety shows. She also co-starred in Jesus Franco's Marquis de Sade: Justine (1969), as well as Mario Bava's 1972 film Lisa and the Devil.

From the early 1960s, she invested most of her considerable earnings in a luxurious villa, in the well-to-do district of Marino, Rome, complete with 16th-century furniture and artistic paintings. That lasted until her spending overcame her dwindling income, and she had to face a tax evasion inquest, when she was forced to sell her house in 1976. Living with Raimondo Castelli since 1960, they did not marry due to then Italian law and because his wife Marinella refused him an annulment. Castelli and Koscina married in Mexico in 1967, but that marriage was not recognized in Italy.

 (1929–2002) photographed Koscina for the American edition of Playboy in May 1967.

After passing 30, she partnered with actors such as Kirk Douglas in A Lovely Way to Die (1968) and Paul Newman in The Secret War of Harry Frigg (1967), but without any luck. Her career was given a boost in the second half of the 1960s when she was photographed bare-breasted in the Italian edition of Playboy magazine. Mauro Bolognini's L'assoluto naturale (1969) was released, complete with a "chaste" full nude shot.

She also starred in the 1967 comedy caper Three Bites of the Apple with David McCallum, and Deadlier Than the Male (1967), in which  Elke Sommer and she portrayed sophisticated professional killers dueling with Bulldog Drummond. She also played Danica in the Yugoslavian movie The Battle of Neretva, in 1969. She played a German doctor, Bianca, in Hornets' Nest with Rock Hudson.

Personal quotes
 On her notorious love scene in L'assoluto naturale (1969) – "Of course, if it had not been for the director, I wouldn't have done this film."

Death
Koscina died in Rome in 1994, aged 61, from breast cancer.

Selected filmography

 Are We Men or Corporals? (1955) - L'aspirante attrice
 The Railroad Man (1956) - Giulia Marcocci
 Michel Strogoff (1956) - Sangarre
 Engaged to Death (1957) - Lucia
 Guendalina (1957) - Francesca Redaelli, madre di Guendalina
 Oh! Sabella (1957) - Lucia
 Femmine tre volte (1957) - Sonia
 Le naïf aux 40 enfants (1957) - Gina Lantois
 The Mighty Crusaders (1957) - Clorinda
 Hercules (1958) - Iole, Daughter of Pelias
 Young Husbands (1958) - Mara Rossi Bandelli
 Ladro lui, ladra lei (1958) - Cesira De Angelis
 Quando gli angeli piangono (1958) - Marta
 Toto in Paris (1958) - Juliette Marchand
 Mogli pericolose (1958) - Tosca
 Toto in the Moon (1958) - Lidia
 Girls for the Summer (1958) - Renata Morandi
 Non sono più Guaglione (1958) - Carolina
 Hercules Unchained (1959) - Iole
 Poveri milionari (1959) - Alice
 Le confident de ces dames (1959) - La docteur Maria Bonifati
 La nipote Sabella (1959) - Lucia
 Uncle Was a Vampire (1959) - Carla
 La cambiale (1959) - Odette Mercury
 Le sorprese dell'amore (1959) - Marianna
 Il vedovo (1959) - Herself (uncredited)
 Genitori in blue-jeans (1960) - Elena
 Siege of Syracuse (1960) - Clio
 I piaceri dello scapolo (1960) - Eby
 Trapped by Fear (1960) - Arabelle
 Le pillole di Ercole (1960) - Silvia Pasqui
 Mariti in pericolo (1960) - Silvana
 Ravishing (1960) - Evelyne Cotteret
 Femmine di lusso (1960) - Luciana
 Il Vigile (1960) - Herself
 Blood Feud (1961) - Carla
 Mani in alto (1961)
 Jessica (1962) - Nunzia Tuffi
 Le massaggiatrici (1962) - Marisa
 Swordsman of Siena (1962) - Orietta Arconti
 Le Masque de fer (1962) - Marion
 Copacabana Palace (1962) - Ines
 Three Fables of Love (1962) - Mia (segment "Le lièvre et le tortue")
 La salamandre d'or (1962) - (uncredited)
 The Shortest Day (1963)
 Il Fornaretto di Venezia (1963) - Clemenza, Barbo's Wife
 Le monachine (1963) - Elena
 Rampage (1963) - Stewardess
 Judex (1963) - Daisy
 Girl's Apartment (1963) - Eléna
 Hot Enough for June (1964) - Vlasta Simoneva
 Love in Four Dimensions (1964) - Irma, la moglie (segment "Amore e vita")
 Let's Talk About Women (1964) - Reluctant Girl
 Corpse for the Lady (1964) - Laura Guglielmetti
 Cyrano et d'Artagnan (1964) - Ninon de l'Enclos
 Love and Marriage (1964) - (segment "Sabato 18 luglio")
 Le grain de sable (1964) - Alexandra Fonseca
 Una storia di notte (1964) - Maddalena
 The Dictator's Guns (1965) - Rae Osborne
 The Double Bed (1965) - Giulietta / Peggy
 That Man in Istanbul (1965) - Kelly
 The Dreamer (1965) - Irene
 Juliet of the Spirits (1965) - Sylva
 Thrilling (1965) - Paola (segment "L'autostrada del sole")
 I soldi (1965) - Leda
 Made in Italy (1965) - Diana (segment "3 'La Donna', episode 3")
 Agent X-77 Orders to Kill (1966) - Mania
 Me, Me, Me... and the Others (1966) - The 'Star'
 Monnaie de singe (1966) - Lucile
 Carré de dames pour un as (1966) - Dolorès Arrabal, Fashion Designer
 Three Bites of the Apple (1967) - Carla Moretti
 Deadlier Than the Male (1967) - Penelope
 Johnny Banco (1967) - Laureen Moore
 The Secret War of Harry Frigg (1968) - Countess Francesca Di Montefiore
 A Lovely Way to Die (1968) - Rena Westabrook
 The Protagonists (1968) - Nancy
 Kampf um Rom (1968-1969, part 1, 2) - Empress Theodora
 Marquis de Sade: Justine (1969) - La marquise de Bressac
 I See Naked (1969) - Herself
 L'assoluto naturale (1969) - She
 Battle of Neretva (1969) - Danica
 La colomba non deve volare (1970) - Anna Duplessis
  (1970) - Sylvie Dussart
 La modification (1970) - Cécile
 Hornets' Nest (1970) - Dr. Bianca
 Ninì Tirabusciò, la donna che inventò la mossa (1970) - Baroness di Valdarno
 Il sesso del diavolo (1971) - Sylvia, the Assistant
 Mazzabubù... quante corna stanno quaggiù? (1971) - La moglie del presentatore
 The Great Swindle (1971) - Lola
 Les jambes en l'air (1971) - Favouille Grandblaise
 Man of the Year (1971) - Carla
 African Story (1971) - Barbara Hayland
 No desearás la mujer del vecino (1971) - Susana
 Perché non ci lasciate in pace? (1971)
 Boccaccio (1972) - Fiametta
 So Sweet, So Dead (1972) - Barbara Capuana
 Sette scialli di seta gialla (1972) - Françoise Ballais
 Beati i ricchi (1972) - Contessa Tanzini
 La mala ordina (1972) - Lucia Canali
 Uccidere in silenzio (1972) - Madre di Valeria
 My Pleasure Is Your Pleasure (1973) - La moglie del tintore
 Lisa and the Devil (1973) - Sophia Lehar
 Un par de zapatos del '32 (1974) - Sonya Dorigny
 Las correrías del Vizconde Arnau (1974) - Zoraida
 Delitto d'autore (1974) - Milena Gottardi
 Il cav. Costante Nicosia demoniaco, ovvero: Dracula in Brianza (1975) - Mariù - wife of Costante
 Clara and Nora (1975)
 Casanova & Co. (1977) - The Prefect's Wife
 Sunday Lovers (1980) - Zaira (segment "Armando's Notebook")
 Asso (1981) - Enrichetta Morgan
 Questo e Quello (1983) - Dora (segment "Quello... col basco rosso")
 Mani di fata (1983) - Contessa Irene
 Cenerentola '80 (1984) - Princess Gherardeschi
 Die Nacht der vier Monde (1984)
 Rimini Rimini (1987) - Countess Rita-Engineer Pedercini's Sister
 Ricky & Barabba (1992) - Cristina Bonelli
 Kim Novak Is on the Phone (1994) - Enrico's Mother (final film role)

Theatre
 La commedia del Decamerone (The Decameron Comedy) by Mario Amendola and Bruno Corbucci with Sylva Koscina, Marisa Solinas, Vittorio Congia, Anna Campori. Directed by Amendola & Corbucci. (1972)

References

External links

1933 births
1994 deaths
20th-century Italian actresses
Deaths from cancer in Lazio
Deaths from breast cancer
Italian film actresses
Italian models
Italian people of Greek descent
Italian people of Polish descent
Yugoslav emigrants to Italy
Actors from Split, Croatia
Croatian expatriates in Italy
Burials at the Cimitero Flaminio
Croatian people of Greek descent
Croatian people of Polish descent